Radësh is a village in the former municipality of Qendër Skrapar in Berat County, Albania. At the 2015 local government reform it became part of the municipality Skrapar.

References

Populated places in Skrapar
Villages in Berat County